Grandpa Fred may refer to:
 Grandpa Fred, a character in Gremlins 2: The New Batch, portrayed by Robert Prosky, a parody of the Grandpa character  in The Munsters.
 Grandpa Fred, a character in Sixteen Candles, portrayed by Max Showalter.
 Grandpa Fred, a puppet used by American ventriloquist David Strassman.
 Grandpa Fred, a character in Maybe It's Me.